Fadmoor is a village and civil parish in the Ryedale district of North Yorkshire, England.

The name Fadmoor comes from Old English and means moor of a man called Fadda.

References

External links

Villages in North Yorkshire
Civil parishes in North Yorkshire